Lee Ann Michelle (born 17 March 1960) is an English model and actress. She was chosen as Playboy magazine's Playmate of the Month for the February 1979 issue. Her centerfold was photographed by Mario Casilli. She is the first Playmate to have been born in the 1960s.

She was born in  Surrey, England. Her real name is Carol Needham and she was called Carol earlier in her career, including when she posed topless for the newspapers The Sun and Daily Mirror. Her debut was at the age of 16 in the 7 January 1977 edition of The Sun.

In the 1979 film Seven she had an uncredited role playing Sybill.

Needham later married and co-founded a modelling agency called Needham and Hanson Management.

See also
 List of people in Playboy 1970–1979

References

External links
 

1960 births
Living people
1970s Playboy Playmates
People from Surrey